The Fisher Barnstormer is a single-seat tricycle landing gear, reverse-staggered biplane ultralight aircraft designed by Michael Fisher and introduced in mid-1982.

Development
The Barnstormer was intended to meet the requirements of the US FAR 103 Ultralight Vehicles category, including that category's maximum  empty weight.

The aircraft is a single-seat ultralight with an unusual reverse-stagger on its biplane wings, the top wing being behind the bottom wing. The airfoil used is a NACA 2305 section. The control system is a conventional three-axis type with ailerons, elevators and rudder. The airframe structure is of 6061T6 and 2024T3 aluminum tube, covered with Stits Polyfibre aircraft fabric. The landing gear is of a fixed tricycle configuration with bungee-suspension,  main wheels and brakes.

The Barnstormer is fitted with a  Kawasaki 440A engine with a reduction drive system.

The aircraft was not successful commercially and was quickly replaced in the Fisher line by newer designs. Reviewer Andre Cliche stated "This ultralight is handicapped by its awkward and cluttered appearance."

Specifications (Barnstormer)

See also

References

1980s United States ultralight aircraft
Aircraft first flown in 1982
Biplanes with negative stagger
Single-engined tractor aircraft